Big & Rich is an American country music duo founded by Big Kenny and John Rich. Signed to Warner Bros. Records in 2004, the duo has released six studio albums, five extended plays, two extended play/DVD combos, three compilation albums and 20 singles. Their 2004 debut, Horse of a Different Color, is also their highest-selling album, certified 3× Platinum by the Recording Industry Association of America (RIAA) and gold by the Canadian Recording Industry Association (CRIA). 2005's Comin' to Your City is certified platinum by the RIAA, and 2007's Between Raising Hell and Amazing Grace is certified gold by the same. Their first EP/DVD combo, Big & Rich's Super Galactic Fan Pak, is also certified platinum.

Of Big & Rich's singles, sixteen have charted on Billboard Hot Country Songs or Country Airplay, with all but four reaching Top 40 or higher. They have had two Top Ten hits: "Lost in This Moment", a number one country hit; and "Look at You".

Studio albums

Extended plays

Compilation albums

Singles

2000s

2010s

Other singles

Other charted songs

Guest singles

Videography

Music videos

Guest appearances

Notes

References

Country music discographies
Discographies of American artists